Fantasy in the Sky was the first fireworks performance at Disneyland in Anaheim, California, beginning in 1958 and running until 1996 (with short engagements in 2004 and early 2015). The show also appeared at the Magic Kingdom in Lake Buena Vista, Florida from 1971 until 2003, at Tokyo Disneyland in Urayasu, Chiba, Japan from 1983 until 1988 (with engagements from 1995 until 1997, and again from 2001 until 2003) and at Disneyland Paris from 1993 to 2005 in Marne-la-Vallee, France.

Walt Disney requested a fireworks show against the backdrop of Sleeping Beauty Castle at Disneyland in 1958, to keep guests at the park for longer hours and provide much needed night-time entertainment. Early shows were performed by having cast members manually launch hand flares. The show lasted less than five minutes, and was accompanied by music, with no narration (as is common in Disney parks fireworks today). The show was extremely popular, and became a vital component of the Disneyland experience. 

When the second Disney park, the Magic Kingdom, opened in Florida in 1971, it was only natural to duplicate the show there. The predecessors to Walt Disney Creative Entertainment, the company who create all the entertainment for Disney parks worldwide, were able to produce a much larger show with a bigger budget and more space to work with Cinderella Castle is almost three times as tall as its Californian cousin.

As the shows aged, many guests began to miss out the fireworks in their visits as they had seen them so many times. In early 2000, to celebrate Disneyland's 45th anniversary, the Disneyland Entertainment team produced a lavish fireworks production to replace the old show, Believe... There's Magic in the Stars. Many guests formed a sentimental attachment to the show, especially when the company created a new additional section of the show, for Christmas, Believe... In Holiday Magic. Believe was itself replaced in 2005 with a special fireworks spectacular, Remember... Dreams Come True, celebrating Disneyland's fiftieth birthday, making it the most expensive fireworks show Disney has ever developed, with shells all around the park and projects, pyrotechnics and creative lighting. Believe was actually discontinued in 2004, while WDCE were developing Remember, Disneyland Entertainment created a new, smaller show using elements from both Fantasy in the Sky and Believe was created to bridge the gap between Believe and Remember; Imagine... A Fantasy in the Sky.

At the Magic Kingdom, Fantasy in the Sky was only discontinued in 2003. Following the example of Believe at Disneyland, Walt Disney Creative Entertainment developed another show aimed at creating emotional responses among guests, and the result was Wishes. The show was an instant hit, and the theme of the show became the official Magic Kingdom song, as well as forming the base music for Remember at Disneyland. In 2005, the show was extravagantly updated with two additional tags (like the Believe holiday tag) for Halloween and Christmas respectively, both included additions such as releasing fireworks all around the theme park from launch sites surrounding the Seven Seas Lagoon, not just the castle area. HalloWishes and Holiday Wishes became hits in their own right. A third special themed fireworks show, Magic, Music and Mayhem was created in 2007 for Mickey's Pirate and Princess Party and has become a hit in its first two seasons.  Two more special fireworks shows debuted in 2008 themed to Independence Day and New Year's Eve, listed below.

At Disneyland Paris, Fantasy in the Sky was discontinued in 2005 to make way for Wishes, a multimedia version of the Magic Kingdom's night time fireworks display produced in honor of Disneyland's fiftieth anniversary. Fantasy in the Sky was sometimes known as Tinkerbell's Fantasy in the Sky or Fantasy in the Sky with Tinkerbell! in Disney literature.

Special performances
At Disneyland, Fantasy in the Sky was brought back from retirement to feature at the 2004 and 2005 July 4 celebrations and on New Year's Eve in 2004 through 2007. A 2008 revival was cancelled due to high winds. At the Magic Kingdom, it has been performed every year on the December 30 and 31, as well as on July 3–4; the July 3 and 4 shows being held in 360 degrees around the park and the Seven Seas Lagoon concurrently. However, WDW has announced new fireworks shows to replace Fantasy in the Sky for Independence Day ("Disney's Celebrate America: A 4th of July Concert in the Sky").

Fantasy in the Sky returned for Disneyland and Walt Disney World for 2009 New Year Celebration.

In early 2015, a version of Fantasy in the Sky was brought back at Disneyland Park to bridge the gap between Remember... Dreams Come True ending and Disneyland Forever premiering as part of the park's 60th anniversary. Fantasy in the Sky'''s last performance was on May 20, 2015.

On August 2, 2016, it was announced that Fantasy in the Sky would be returning to Disneyland Park starting on September 9, 2016.

For the 2020 New Years Celebration, the Disneyland show was not presented, and was replaced by Mickeys Mix Magic, a fireworks show that was used in the 2019 spring season to celebrate Mickey Mouse's 90th birthday.

Lifetime changes

Disneyland

The Disneyland version of the show not only has some major soundtrack changes but it also got other changes which include the pyrotechnics, and the castle's adjacent lighting. Fantasy in the Sky in Disneyland isn't always held during New Year's Eve, and the east coast new year celebrations, but they even host this spectacular during a special event throughout the entire park called Throwback Nite. This event always held in Disneyland Park happens every January or February and not during the New Year's Eve special events. Sometimes, it also has been used to bridge the gaps of shows if one discontinues the show while the others are creating a brand new fireworks spectacular for the park. This fireworks spectacular is operated from the discontinuation of the first show, and runs until the time the new show is set to debut at the park.

 Soundtrack changed in opening and finale to as part of inclusivity key.

Magic Kingdom

The Magic Kingdom version of the show has changed so much over the years. The show now inherits pyrotechnics from other spectaculars such as Once Upon a Time, Wishes and Happily Ever After. This fireworks spectacular used to be in Mickey's Not So Scary Halloween Party for a single year, but it can still be seen during the New Year's Eve special events. The spectacular is presented to the park four times every year from December 30, to January 1. The first performance is at 7:00 PM while the second performance is at 11:50 PM. Until 2017, the 7:00 PM performance of the show was actually Holiday Wishes instead of Fantasy in the Sky but it still has the big New Year's Eve finale.

Soundtrack
The soundtrack for the Magic Kingdom 1990s version was released on two official albums:
 Walt Disney World Resort: The Official Album (1999 CD)
 Walt Disney World Resort: Official Album (2000 CD)

The soundtrack for the Disneyland Paris version was released on:
 Disneyland Paris: Main Street Electrical Parade (2000 CD)

Show soundtrack

Disneyland version

1958–1966
 "Heigh-Ho"
 "Mickey Mouse March" (from "The Mickey Mouse Club")
 "Bibbidi-Bobbidi-Boo"
 "Whistle While You Work"
 "You Can Fly, You Can Fly, You Can Fly" The world first fireworks soundtrack

1966–1996
 "Zip-A-Dee-Doo-Dah" (from Song of the South)
 "A Dream Is a Wish Your Heart Makes" (from Cinderella)Mary Poppins "Supercalifragilisticexpialidocious" 
 "Let's Go Fly a Kite"
 "It's a Small World Song" (from It's a Small World)
 Snow White and the Seven Dwarfs "Whistle While You Work"
 "Heigh-Ho"
 "Raiders March" (from Raiders of the Lost Ark) (1995 season only)
 "Mickey Mouse March" (from The Mickey Mouse Club)
 "Sorcerer's Apprentice" (from Fantasia)
 "The Patriotic Song this is my country"

2015–2019
 "A Dream Is a Wish Your Heart Makes" (from "Cinderella")
"Mary Poppins"
 "Supercalifragilisticexpialidocious"
 "Let's Go Fly a Kite"
 "It's a Small World Song" (from "It's a Small World")
 "Snow White and the Seven Dwarfs"
 "Whistle While You Work"
 "Heigh-Ho"
 "Zip-A-Dee-Doo-Dah" (from "Song of the South")

Disneyland New Year’s Eve 2000–2002
Dramatic End of Year Music
Countdown
"Auld Lang Syne"
Celebrate The Future Hand in Hand
When You Wish Upon a Star/Celebrate The Future Hand in Hand

New Year's Eve (2008–2019 version)
 "Dramatic End of Year Music"
 "Auld Lang Syne"
 "A Dream Is a Wish Your Heart Makes" (from "Cinderella")
"Mary Poppins"
 "Supercalifragilisticexpialidocious"
 "Let's Go Fly a Kite"
 "It's a Small World Song" (from "It's a Small World")
 "Snow White and the Seven Dwarfs"
 "Whistle While You Work"
 "Heigh-Ho"
 "Zip-A-Dee-Doo-Dah" (from "Song of the South")

New Year's Eve (2021–2022, present version)
 "Dramatic End of Year Music"
 "Auld Lang Syne"
 "A Dream Is a Wish Your Heart Makes" (from "Cinderella")
"Mary Poppins"
 "Supercalifragilisticexpialidocious"
 "Let's Go Fly a Kite"
 "It's a Small World Song" (from "It's a Small World")
 "Snow White and the Seven Dwarfs"
 "Whistle While You Work"
 "Heigh-Ho"
 "When You Wish Upon a Star" (from Pinocchio)

Magic Kingdom version (25th anniversary version)
"When You Wish upon a Star" (from Pinocchio) (opening for the 25th anniversary version)
 "Zip-A-Dee-Doo-Dah" (from Song of the South)
 "A Dream Is a Wish Your Heart Makes" (from Cinderella)Mary Poppins "Supercalifragilisticexpialidocious" 
 "Let's Go Fly a Kite"
 "It's a Small World Song" (from It's a Small World)
 Snow White and the Seven Dwarfs "Whistle While You Work"
 "Heigh-Ho"
 "Mickey Mouse March" (from The Mickey Mouse Club)
 "Remember the Magic (WDW 25th Anniversary encore)"

 Magic Kingdom version (Millennium Celebration version) (1999–2000) (New Year version) (2007–present) 
 Peter Pan "The Second Star to the Right"
 "You Can Fly, You Can Fly, You Can Fly"
 "I've Got No Strings" (from Pinocchio)
 "It's a Small World Song" (from It's a Small World)
 "Grim Grinning Ghosts" (from The Haunted Mansion)
 "The Ballad of Davy Crockett" (from Davy Crockett, King of the Wild Frontier)
 "Yo Ho (A Pirate's Life for Me)" (from Pirates of the Caribbean)
 "Under the Sea" (from The Little Mermaid)
 "A Whole New World" (from Aladdin)
 "When You Wish upon a Star" (from Pinocchio)
 Reprise of "A Whole New World"
 Countdown to the New Year - hosted by Mickey, Minnie, and Goofy
 Auld Lang Syne
 Celebrate The Future Hand in Hand (1999–2000 Version)

Magic Kingdom Version (1999–2003 version)
 Peter Pan "The Second Star to the Right"
 "You Can Fly, You Can Fly, You Can Fly"
 "I've Got No Strings" (from Pinocchio)
 "It's a Small World Song" (from It's a Small World)
 "Grim Grinning Ghosts" (from The Haunted Mansion)
 "The Ballad of Davy Crockett" (from Davy Crockett, King of the Wild Frontier)
 "Yo Ho (A Pirate's Life for Me)" (from Pirates of the Caribbean)
 "Under the Sea" (from The Little Mermaid)
 "A Whole New World" (from Aladdin)
 "When You Wish upon a Star" (from Pinocchio)
 Reprise of "A Whole New World"

Magic Kingdom version (Halloween Version)
 Peter Pan "The Second Star to the Right"
 "You Can Fly, You Can Fly, You Can Fly"
 "I've Got No Strings" (from Pinocchio)
 "It's a Small World Song" (from It's a Small World)
 "Grim Grinning Ghosts" (from The Haunted Mansion)
 "The Ballad of Davy Crockett" (from Davy Crockett, King of the Wild Frontier)
 "Yo Ho (A Pirate's Life for Me)" (from Pirates of the Caribbean)
 "Under the Sea" (from The Little Mermaid)
"Night on Bald Mountain" (from Fantasia; voice-over by the Wicked Witch from Snow White and the Seven Dwarfs)

Magic Kingdom version (New Year version) (2005–2006)
 Peter Pan "The Second Star to the Right"
 "You Can Fly, You Can Fly, You Can Fly"
 "I've Got No Strings" (from Pinocchio)
 "It's a Small World Song" (from It's a Small World)
 "Grim Grinning Ghosts" (from The Haunted Mansion)
 "The Ballad of Davy Crockett" (from Davy Crockett, King of the Wild Frontier)
 "Yo Ho (A Pirate's Life for Me)" (from Pirates of the Caribbean)
 "Under the Sea" (from The Little Mermaid)
 Countdown to the New Year - hosted by Mickey, Minnie, and Goofy
 Auld Lang Syne
 "A Whole New World" (from Aladdin)
 "When You Wish Upon A Star" (from Pinocchio)
 Reprise of "A Whole New World"

Tokyo Disneyland Version (1983–2003 Version)
 "A Dream Is a Wish Your Heart Makes" (from Cinderella)Mary Poppins "Let's Go Fly a Kite"
 "It's a Small World Song" (from It's a Small World)
 Snow White and the Seven Dwarfs "Whistle While You Work"
 "Heigh-Ho"
 "Mickey Mouse March" (from The Mickey Mouse Club)
 "Zip-A-Dee-Doo-Dah" (from "Song of the South")

Tokyo Disneyland Special Version (September 2, 2001)
 "Tokyo DisneySea Medley"
Note: this is not a part

Disneyland Paris version
 Peter Pan''
 "You Can Fly, You Can Fly, You Can Fly"
 "Following the Leader"
 "What Made the Red Man Red"
 "Never Smile at a Crocodile"
 "A Pirate's Life"
 "The Elegant Captain Hook"
 Reprise of "You Can Fly, You Can Fly, You Can Fly"
 Reprise of "Never Smile at a Crocodile" (plays as the exit music for the show)

References

Former Walt Disney Parks and Resorts attractions
Walt Disney Parks and Resorts fireworks